Senator Dent may refer to:

Charlie Dent (born 1960), Pennsylvania State Senate
George Dent (1756–1813), Maryland State Senate
John Herman Dent (1908–1988), Pennsylvania State Senate